The Yangon Workers' Hospital is a public hospital in Yangon, Myanmar. It is one of the three social security hospitals and provides free medical services to insured workers with the Social Security Board. It is also a teaching hospital of University of Medicine 1, Yangon.

References 

Hospital buildings completed in 1962
Hospitals in Yangon